Tambopata can refer to any of the following entities:

Tambopata Province in the department of Madre de Dios in south-eastern Peru
Tambopata District in the Tambopata Province
Tambopata River, a tributary to the Madre de Dios River
Tambopata-Candamo reserve, adjacent to the Tambopata River